The 1876 FA Cup final  was a football match between Wanderers and Old Etonians on 11 March 1876 at Kennington Oval in London.  It was the fifth final of the world's oldest football competition, the Football Association Challenge Cup (known in the modern era as the FA Cup).  Wanderers had won the Cup on two previous occasions.  The Etonians were playing in their second consecutive final, having lost in the 1875 final.  Both teams had conceded only one goal in the four rounds prior to the final.  In the semi-finals Wanderers defeated Swifts and the Etonians beat the 1874 FA Cup winners Oxford University.

The match finished in a 1–1 draw, the second time an FA Cup final had finished all-square. John Hawley Edwards scored for Wanderers, but the Etonians equalised with a goal credited in modern publications to Alexander Bonsor, although contemporary newspaper reports do not identify him as the scorer.  A week later, the replay took place at the same venue.  The Etonians were forced to make a number of changes due to players being unavailable, and the revised team was no match for the Wanderers, who won 3–0.  Charles Wollaston and Thomas Hughes scored a goal apiece in a five-minute spell before half-time, and Hughes added the third early in the second half.

Route to the final

Old Etonians, the team for former pupils of Eton College, had reached the 1875 final but been defeated by Royal Engineers.  Wanderers had won the competition in both 1872 and 1873 but had not progressed beyond the quarter-finals in the subsequent two seasons.  Both teams entered the 1875–76 competition at the first round stage and were allocated matches at home. Wanderers defeated a team from the 1st Surrey Rifles regiment 5–0, and the Etonians overcame Pilgrims 4–1. In the second round Wanderers defeated Crystal Palace (not the current professional club) 3–0 and the Etonians had an easy win over Maidenhead, scoring eight goals without reply.

At the quarter-final stage, Wanderers took on the world's oldest football club, Sheffield F.C. and won 20, and the Etonians gained a 1–0 victory over Clapham Rovers. Both semi-final matches took place at Kennington Oval in London, as stipulated in the original rules of the competition.  The Etonians beat the 1874 FA Cup winners Oxford University 10 in the first semi-final, and a week later Wanderers clinched their place in the final, defeating the Slough-based club Swifts 21.

Match

Summary

Three sets of brothers played in the match.  Francis and Hubert Heron lined up for the Wanderers, while the Etonians' team included Hon. Edward Lyttelton and his brother Hon. Alfred Lyttelton and Albert Meysey-Thompson and his brother Charles.  The latter pair's surname had been simply Thompson until it was changed in 1874, and for the final Albert played under the name Thompson and Charles under the name Meysey. This is the only occasion that two or more pairs of brothers have played in the same FA Cup final. Later that year, Francis Birley married Margaret, sister of his teammate Jarvis Kenrick.

The Etonian team also included Julian Sturgis, who had been born in the U.S. and was the first foreign-born player to appear in the Cup Final (discounting those born to British parents in the British Empire), as well as Arthur Kinnaird, who had captained Wanderers to victory in the 1873 FA Cup final. Wanderers began the match with two full-backs, two half-backs and six forwards, while the Etonians opted for one full-back, two half-backs and seven forwards.

Wanderers won the coin toss and chose to start the game defending the Harleyford Road end of The Oval. The crowd was estimated at 3,500, the largest for an FA Cup final up to that point. The match was played in a strong wind, to the extent that when Frederick Maddison took a corner kick for Wanderers, the gale blew the ball back out of play. The Wanderers dominated the early stages of the game, but the Etonians kept them at bay for around 35 minutes until Charles Wollaston eluded Thompson and passed the ball to John Hawley Edwards, who kicked it narrowly under the crossbar of the Etonians' goal to give Wanderers the lead. In the second half the Old Etonians had the wind in their favour and had the better of the play.  Around five minutes after the interval, a corner kick to the Etonians led to a "scrimmage" (a term in common use at the time to describe a group of players struggling to gain possession of the ball) in front of their opponents' goal, which resulted in the ball and a number of players being forced over the goal-line, uprooting the goalposts in the process.  Modern sources credit the goal to Alexander Bonsor, but contemporary newspaper reports in The Sporting Life and Bell's Life in London do not mention his name, merely noting that the goal was scored "from a scrimmage". Neither team could manage to score another goal, and the game finished with the scores level, meaning that for the second successive season a replay would be needed to determine the winners of the competition.

Details

Replay

Summary
The replay took place one week later at the same venue.  The Wanderers fielded an unchanged team, but the Etonians had to make a number of changes, as Meysey was injured and three other players were unavailable due to other commitments.  One of the replacements, Edgar Lubbock, had not long recovered from a bout of illness and was noted as being out of practice, and Kinnaird was still suffering the after-effects of an injury sustained in the original match.

The weather on the day of the match was extremely cold, with the threat of snow.  The Etonians began the match playing in a rough manner, and there were also many appeals from the players for handball, which disrupted play.  After around half an hour, the Wanderers' forwards surged towards their opponents' goal and Charles Wollaston got the final kick which sent the ball past goalkeeper Quintin Hogg, one of the replacement players brought in for the replay. Almost immediately afterwards, another massed attack by the Wanderers led to Thomas Hughes doubling the lead.

Soon after half-time, Hawley Edwards, Francis Heron and Jarvis Kenrick combined in a skilful attack and set up Hughes to score his second goal of the game. Although the Wanderers' goalkeeper, W. D. O. Greig, was called into action several times, the Etonians were unable to get the ball past him, and the match finished 3–0 to the Wanderers. The winning team's captain Francis Birley was praised for his performance by the press, as were both Lyttleton brothers for the Etonians.

Details

Post-match
As occurred each year until 1882, the winning team did not receive the trophy at the stadium on the day of the match, but later in the year at their annual dinner. In addition to receiving the Cup, the winning team each received a gold medal from the committee of Surrey County Cricket Club. A week after the replay, four of the victorious Wanderers were chosen to represent London in a match against an equivalent team from Sheffield.  Despite their presence, the London XI lost the game 6–0.

References
General

Specific

External links
 Match report at www.fa-cupfinals.co.uk
FA Cup Final line-ups

1876
FA
1876 sports events in London
March 1876 sports events